Minstrel Boy is a compilation album from Scottish singer-songwriter Donovan. It was released in the United Kingdom (PRT Records DOW 13) in July 1983 and did not chart.

History
In 1983, PRT Records issued another repackaging of Donovan's 1965 Pye Records recordings and titled it Minstrel Boy.  To entice buyers, the album was released as a 10" LP.

Track listing
All tracks by Donovan Leitch, except where noted.

Side one

"Catch the Wind"
"Colours"
"Turquoise"
"Josie"

Side two

"Universal Soldier" (Buffy Sainte-Marie)
"Remember the Alamo" (Jane Bowers)
"Donna Donna" (Aaron Zeitlin, Sholom Secunda, Arthur S Kevess, Teddi Schwartz)
"Ballad of a Crystal Man"

External links
 Minstrel Boy – Donovan Unofficial Site

1983 compilation albums
Donovan compilation albums